The men's 1500 metre freestyle event at the 2014 Commonwealth Games as part of the swimming programme took place on 28 and 29 July at the Tollcross International Swimming Centre in Glasgow, Scotland.

The medals were presented by Peter Sirett, Chairman of the Guernsey Commonwealth Games Association and the quaichs were presented by Jon Doig, Chief Executive Officer of Commonwealth Games Scotland.

Records
Prior to this competition, the existing world and Commonwealth Games records were as follows.

Results

Heats

Final

References

External links

Men's 1500 metre freestyle
Commonwealth Games